Charles Cotton (1630–1687) was an English poet.

Charles Cotton may also refer to:
Sir Charles Cotton, 5th Baronet (1753–1812), British Royal Navy admiral
Sir Charles Cotton (geologist) (1885–1970), New Zealand geologist and geomorphologist
Charles L. Cotton (born 1949), president of the National Rifle Association (NRA)
Charlie Cotton, fictional character in British soap opera, EastEnders
Charles Cotton (footballer) (1880–1910), former English footballer who played as a goalkeeper